Bystré is a town in Svitavy District in the Pardubice Region of the Czech Republic. It has about 1,500 inhabitants. The town centre is well preserved and is protected by law as an urban monument zone.

Administrative parts

The village of Hamry is an administrative part of Bystré.

Geography
It lies in the Upper Svratka Highlands.

History

The first written mention of Bystré is from 1200 in the chronicle written by Wenceslaus Hajek, where it is written about Bystré in the year 1021 or 1098. The chronicle is not considered a credible source, however archaeological excavations show that Bystré did exist already in the 11th century.

Until 1213, Bystré was owned by the Mokrošínský family, who extended the settlement and had built a square shaped as a horseshoe. Since 1213 the village belonged to Svojanov manor, later owned by Zavis of Falkenstein. After his death, Bystré became a property of the royal chamber. Bystré received the town rights during the reign of Charles IV.

In the 15th century, it became property of Svojanovský of Boskovice family. In 1507, the town gained a number of privileges, such as toll collection right and the right for a weekly market. Sometime during the 16th century, a small hunting fortress was built. Jan Bezdružický of Kolowrat became the town owner in the 1580s. In 1586–1590 he had built a new Renaissance castle. Jan died in 1604 and was buried in a tomb in the local church.

The following owners, lords of Martinice, started mining of iron ore in Hamry (currently a part of the municipality of Bystré). During the Thirty Years' War the town was devastated. Janu Pavel of Valderode bought the manor of Bystré in 1686. In 1707 the manor was sold again, this time in an auction to the count of Liechtenstein who exchanged it with Jakub Hanibal, the count of Hohenems, in 1710. Jakub Hanibal had built the town hall. During the rule of his son, Franz Rudolph, the construction of a new church started and spa Balda was founded in the neighborhood. As the counts of Hohenems died out in 1869, Bystré manor was passed to Emperor Franz Joseph I who owned it until the establishment of Czechoslovakia in 1918.

Sights

The Church of Saint John the Baptist and Our Lady of Mount Carmel in one of the largest Baroque churches in the region. It was originally built in the 12th century and rebuilt in 1601. The current appearance is after reconstructions in the 1720s. Its rarity is the decoration, which is exclusively wood. The nearby rectory was built in 1690–1692.

The Baroque town hall built in 1716–1719 is unique with its high gabled roof and clock tower in all four directions.

The Bystré Castle is one of the landmarks in the town. Nowadays the premises of the castle houses social care institute and special primary school. It includes a large castle park open to the public.

The Brtoun's Cottage is a preserved folk architecture house built in 1723. It contains a small museum with an exposition of handmade shoemaking.

In popular culture
Vojtěch Jasný's movie All My Compatriots was in 1968 filmed in Bystré and its surroundings. Also the filming of a stand-alone sequel Návrat ztraceného ráje partially took place in Bystré in 1999.

Twin towns – sister cities

Bystré is twinned with:
 Hohenems, Austria

Gallery

References

External links

Cities and towns in the Czech Republic
Populated places in Svitavy District